Salijon Abdurahmanov (born 28 May 1950 in Nukus, Uzbekistan) is an Uzbek journalist who contributed to Radio Free Europe, Voice of America and uznews.net. In October 2008, he was given a ten-year prison sentence for marijuana and opium possession. He asserted his innocence of the charges, stating that the drugs were planted by police officers. Several international human rights NGOs called for his release, including Amnesty International, which designated him a prisoner of conscience. In 2014 he was awarded the Johann Philipp Palm prize for freedom of expression and the press. He was freed from detention in October 2017.

Career 
Abdurahmanov worked as a correspondent for Radio Free Europe until 2005. He also contributed to the Institute for War and Peace Reporting. At the time of his arrest, he was a contributor to Voice of America's Uzbek service as well as the independent news site uznews.net.

He is an activist for the independence of Karakalpakstan, a region of Uzbekistan bordering the Aral Sea.

Before his journalistic career he taught Russian language and literature for 23 years in a village school in the Amu Darya district of Karakalpakstan.

Arrest for drug possession 
Abdurahmanov stated that the drugs had been planted in retaliation for a story he had recently published about alleged corruption of traffic police. After blood tests found no narcotics in Abdurahmanov's system, the authorities increased the charge to possession with intent to sell. On 10 October 2008, he was found guilty by a district court and sentenced to 10 years in prison. The sentence was upheld by the Karakalpak Supreme Court’s Appeal Commission two days later.

His imprisonment was condemned by a number of international human rights NGOs, which alleged that his arrest was connected to his journalism and activism for the Karakalpakstan separatist movement. Amnesty International designated him a prisoner of conscience, "detained solely for carrying out his human rights activities and exercising his right to freedom of expression". Front Line stated that it was "deeply concerned" by the arrest, and the International Federation for Human Rights and World Organisation Against Torture issued a joint statement urging his release, calling his detention "arbitrary" and for the sole purpose of "sanctioning his human rights activities". The Committee to Protect Journalists called for Abdurahmanov's release and for the Uzbek government to be held accountable for his detention. The Organization for Security and Co-operation in Europe stated that the drug charges were "made-up" and that Abdurahmanov's trial "did not stand the scrutiny of a fair procedure." Human Rights Watch called the conviction "an affront to human rights and free speech".

Jeff Gedmin, president of Abdurahmanov's former employer Radio Free Europe, also spoke against the arrest, stating, "If President Islam Karimov is eager to rehabilitate his country's reputation, he should stop treating free speech as a criminal offense and let Abdurahmanov and nearly 20 other journalists and human rights defenders out of prison immediately."

"Imposter" incident 
In late 2012, the International Committee of the Red Cross attempted unsuccessfully to meet with Abdurahmanov for several months. According to Abdurahmanov's son Davron, at one point, prison authorities introduced another man claiming to be Abdurahmanov to ICRC inspectors. The ICRC inspectors had seen a photograph of the real Abdurahmanov and refused to believe the imposter.

Release from prison 
On 4 October 2017 Abdurahmanov was set free after serving nine years and four months in prison. On his release he thanked human rights organisations for their advocacy.

The UN Human Rights Council later ruled against Abdurahmanov's conviction and recommended that he be compensated for his arrest and unfair trial and imprisonment. As a result Abdurahmanov made an application to the Supreme Court of Uzbekistan to have his conviction overturned. A half-hour court hearing on 23 September 2019 refused the application. During the hearing Abdurahmanov said he was continuing his human rights activities, as deputy chairman of the Human Rights Committee of Uzbekistan, and working as a journalist. A few days later, on 27 September, Abdurahmanov was questioned by the Karakalpakstan public prosecutor about the posting of a video on YouTube and possible extortion. Abdurahmanov denied any involvement and claimed that the interrogation was to "teach me a lesson".

In May 2020 Abdurahmanov gave an interview to Amnesty International in which he discussed the strength he had drawn from international letters of support while he was in prison.

References

External links
 Солижон Абдурахманов. Орол овози on YouTube.

1950 births
Living people
People from Nukus
Uzbekistani journalists
Amnesty International prisoners of conscience held by Uzbekistan
Uzbekistani prisoners and detainees
Voice of America people
People convicted of drug offenses